The Renewables Infrastructure Group is a large British investment trust dedicated to investments in assets generating electricity from renewable sources. Established in 2013, the company is a constituent of the FTSE 250 Index. The chairman is Richard Morse.

Operations 
As of 31 December 2021, the Renewables Infrastructure Group operates a portfolio of 83 projects with a generating capacity of 2,200MW.

References

External links
 

Investment trusts of the United Kingdom
British companies established in 2013
Financial services companies established in 2013
Companies listed on the London Stock Exchange
Renewable electricity
Electric power companies of Guernsey